Xenomigia phaeoloma is a moth of the family Notodontidae. It is found in north-eastern Ecuador.

The length of the forewings is 14.5–17 mm. The ground colour of the forewings is dark brown, the veins thinly lined with orange. The hindwings are translucent light brown from the base to the position of postmedial line, the region beyond that is darker.

The larvae have been reared on Chusquea scandens|Chusquea cf. scandens.

Etymology
The species name is derived from Greek phaios (meaning brown) and loma (meaning hem or border) and refers to the light brown forewing margin.

References

Moths described in 2011
Notodontidae of South America